Tipishsa Airport  is an airport serving the village of Breu (es) in the Ucayali Region of Peru. It may also have an ICAO code of SPBK.

Breu is capital of the Yurúa District. It is on the Juruá River, which drains into the Amazon basin.

See also

Transport in Peru
List of airports in Peru

References

External links
OpenStreetMap - Tipishsa
OurAirports - Tipishsa
SkyVector - Breu
Tipishsa Airport

Airports in Peru
Buildings and structures in Ucayali Region